Joaíma is a Brazilian municipality located in the northeast of the state of Minas Gerais.

The population  was estimated to be 15,455 people living in a total area of 1,668 km². The city belongs to the mesoregion of Jequitinhonha and to the microregion of Almenara.

Joaíma is located 27 km. south of the Jequitinhonha River.  BR-116 is 58 km. to the west.  The elevation is 294 meters.  It became a municipality in 1948.

Neighboring municipalities are: Jequitinhonha, Felisburgo, Monte Formoso, and Santana do Araçuai.

The main economic activities are cattle raising and the cultivation of coffee, sugarcane and corn.  The GDP in 2006 was R$43,727,000.  There were 02 banking agencies .  In the same year there were 392 automobiles, which was a ratio of one automobile for every 50 people.   In the rural area there were 970 farms of which only 21 had tractors.  Most of the farming practiced is on the subsistence level.  There were 62,000 head of cattle in 2006.

This municipality is isolated from major population centers and suffers from drought and poor soils.  
Municipal Human Development Index: .646 (2000)
State ranking: 756 out of 853 municipalities 
National ranking: 3,832 out of 5,138 municipalities 

Degree of urbanization: 70.48% (2000)--the rate for Minas Gerais was 82.0%
Illiteracy rate: 35.51% (15 years old or older) The rate for Minas Gerais was 11.96%; the rate for Brazil was 13.63%
Urban area covered by sewage system: 64.10%--the rate for Minas Gerais was 81.39%
Health centers and hospitals: 07 health centers and 01 hospital with 59  beds

References

See also
 List of municipalities in Minas Gerais

Municipalities in Minas Gerais